Lacey's Spring is an unincorporated community in northeastern Morgan County, Alabama, United States at the base of Brindlee Mountain.  It is included in the Decatur Metropolitan Area, as well as the Huntsville-Decatur Combined Statistical Area. It is located south of Huntsville`s Lands within Morgan County.

The community was established by three Virginia-born brothers, Hopkins, John, and Theophilus Lacy, took on their name and became the site for a U.S. post office in February 1831. "Lacy's Spring" became "Lacey's Spring" when the postal seal furnished by Washington officials mistakenly inserted an "e" into the name.

References

Unincorporated communities in Morgan County, Alabama
Decatur metropolitan area, Alabama
Huntsville-Decatur, AL Combined Statistical Area
Unincorporated communities in Alabama
Alabama populated places on the Tennessee River